Şağan (also, Shagan and Shagany) is a settlement and municipality in Baku, Azerbaijan.  It has a population of 3,191. Shaghan Castle is located here.

References

External links 

Populated places in Baku